Hanoi Road is a short road between Carnarvon Road and Mody Road in Tsim Sha Tsui, Kowloon, Hong Kong. 
It was built in 1892 and opened to traffic in 1893 as “East Road”. It originally started at Chatham Road. After the construction of Mody Road, the easternmost part of Hanoi Road was also named Mody Road.
In 1908, the name was changed to Hanoi Road. 

Almost an entire block west of the road was redeveloped in the early 2000s for the construction of the Masterpiece, a skyscraper featuring K11, a shopping mall. Exits N1 and N2 of the East Tsim Sha Tsui MTR station is located on the road.

See also
List of streets and roads in Hong Kong

References

Roads in Kowloon
Tsim Sha Tsui